Saint Kuksha of the Kyiv Caves (died after 1114) was a monk and martyr from the Pechersk Lavra (Monastery of the Caves) in Kyiv, Ukraine. He has been canonized as a saint in the Russian Orthodox Church for his work spreading Christianity among the heathen East Slavic tribe of Vyatichi (of the Oka basin, in present-day Kaluga, Ryazan, and Tula oblasts of Russia).

This story is told of him:

Being a monk at Kyiv Pechersk Lavra, he left to preach Gospel to idol-worshippers Viatichi. He there performed numerous miracles. Impressed by his powers and rendered receptive by his preaching, the heathens began to convert and accept baptism. Priests of Viatichi, furious over the destruction of their idols, decapitated Kuksha and his pupil. On the day of Kuksha's death, his spiritual father Saint Pimen the Faster stood in the middle of the monastery church and loudly proclaimed: "Our brother Kuksha has been killed this day". Saint Pimen died the same day.

The memory of Saint Kuksha, his follower, and Saint Pimen the Faster is celebrated at the Lavra on the days of their deaths, 27 August O.S. and 27 September O.S.  The relics of Saint Kuksha are kept at St. Anthony Caves of the Lavra.

References

External links
 The PriestMartyr Kuksha and the Monk Pimen the Faster
 (Russian) Karpov, Alexey Yurevich. Venerable Kuksha - the Enlightener of Viatichi

12th-century deaths
Eastern Orthodox saints from Ukraine
Russian saints
Eastern Orthodox missionaries
Monks of Kyiv Pechersk Lavra
12th-century Christian saints
Burials at the Near Caves, Kyiv Pechersk Lavra
12th-century Christian martyrs
11th-century births
12th-century Rus' people